The Mozilla Foundation (stylized as moz://a) is an American non-profit organization that exists to support and collectively lead the open source Mozilla project. Founded in July 2003, the organization sets the policies that govern development, operates key infrastructure and controls Mozilla trademarks and copyrights. It owns a taxable subsidiary: the Mozilla Corporation, which employs many Mozilla developers and coordinates releases of the Mozilla Firefox web browser and Mozilla Thunderbird email client. The Mozilla Foundation was founded by the Netscape-affiliated Mozilla Organization. The organization is currently based in the Silicon Valley city of Mountain View, California, United States.

The Mozilla Foundation describes itself as "a non-profit organization that promotes openness, innovation and participation on the Internet". The Mozilla Foundation is guided by the Mozilla Manifesto, which lists 10 principles which Mozilla believes "are critical for the Internet to continue to benefit the public good as well as commercial aspects of life".

History 

On February 23, 1998, Netscape created the Mozilla Organization to co-ordinate the development of the Mozilla Application Suite. When AOL (Netscape's parent) drastically scaled back its involvement with Mozilla Organization, the Mozilla Foundation was launched on July 15, 2003, to ensure Mozilla could survive without Netscape. AOL assisted in the initial creation of the Mozilla Foundation, transferring hardware and intellectual property to the organization, employed a three-person team for the first three months of its existence to help with the transition, and donated $2 million to the foundation over two years.

Subsidiaries

Mozilla Corporation 

On August 3, 2005, the Mozilla Foundation announced the creation of Mozilla Corporation, described as "a taxable subsidiary that serves the non-profit, public benefit goals of its parent, the Mozilla Foundation, and that will be responsible for product development, marketing and distribution of Mozilla products". It also handles relationships with businesses, many of which generate income. Unlike the Mozilla Foundation, the Mozilla Corporation is a tax-paying entity, which gives it much greater freedom in the revenue and business activities it can pursue. From 2004 to 2014, the majority of revenue came from a deal with Google, which was the default search engine in the Firefox web browser. In November 2014, Mozilla signed a five-year partnership with Yahoo, making Yahoo! Search the default search engine for Firefox in the US. Yandex Search is the default for Firefox in Russia and Baidu continues its role as the default in China.

In November 2017, Mozilla terminated its agreement with Yahoo two years earlier than planned. While numerous factors were attributed to the decision to terminate the agreement, including some mention that Mozilla saw declining revenues related to the switch, likely the impetus was related to the recent acquisition of Yahoo by Verizon and Oath. Per Mozilla Chief Business and Legal Officer Denelle Dixon, "We exercised our contractual right to terminate our agreement with Yahoo! based on a number of factors including doing what's best for our brand, our effort to provide quality web search, and the broader content experience for our users. We believe there are opportunities to work with Oath and Verizon outside of search."

Mozilla China

Beijing Mozilla Online Ltd, a.k.a. Mozilla China, is a wholly owned subsidiary of the Mozilla Corporation. Mozilla China is headquartered in Beijing.

MZLA Technologies Corporation
On January 28, 2020, the Mozilla Foundation announced that the Thunderbird project would henceforth be operating from a new wholly owned subsidiary, MZLA Technologies Corporation, in order to explore offering products and services that were not previously possible and to collect revenue through partnerships and non-charitable donations.

Financing 

The Mozilla Foundation is funded by donations and 2% of annual net revenues from the Mozilla Corporation, amounting to over US$8.3 million in 2016.

Initial funding in 2003 came from AOL, which donated US$2 million, and from Mitch Kapor who donated US$300,000. The group has tax-exempt status under section 501(c)(3) of the U.S. tax code, though the Mozilla Corporation subsidiary is taxable.

In 2006, the Mozilla Foundation received US$66.8 million in revenues, of which US$61.5 million is attributed to "search royalties" from Google.

From 2004 to 2014, the foundation had a deal with Google to make Google Search the default in the Firefox browser search bar and hence send it search referrals; a Firefox themed Google search site was also made the default home page of Firefox.  The original contract expired in November 2006. However, Google renewed the contract until November 2008 and again through 2011. On December 20, 2011, Mozilla announced that the contract was once again renewed for at least three years to November 2014, at three times the amount previously paid, or nearly US$300 million annually. Approximately 90% of Mozilla's royalties revenue for 2014 was derived from this contract.

In November 2014, Mozilla signed a five-year partnership (effective December 2014) with Yahoo!, making Yahoo! Search the default search engine for Firefox in North America. This partnership came with an annual price tag of US$375 million to be paid by Yahoo! or its acquirer in the event of an acquisition. There was also a clause stating that Mozilla reserved the right to terminate the deal early if it did not want to work with the acquirer, but the acquirer would still have to pay Mozilla the full sum per year until 2019. The default search engine in Russia will be Yandex, and in China, Baidu.

In November 2017, however, Mozilla announced that it was switching back to Google as the default search engine. This represented an early termination of its Yahoo partnership.

People 
As of September 2020, the Mozilla Foundation board of directors has seven members:

 Mitchell Baker (Chair)
 Brian Behlendorf
 Mohamed Nanabhay
 Navrina Singh
 Helen Turvey
 Nicole Wong
Wambui Kinya

Mark Surman is the foundation's executive director.

Donations 
In 2006, after a request from Theo de Raadt of OpenBSD for funding from corporate entities which make a profit through the use of OpenSSH in their packaged distributions, the Mozilla Foundation donated $10,000 to de Raadt and OpenBSD for OpenSSH development. The funds donated came from money earned through the income provided by Google. The Mozilla Foundation found that without OpenSSH, much of the work done by developers would be through insecure and unsafe methods, and gave the funds as a thank you.

At the end of 2010, the Mozilla Foundation partnered with Knoxville Zoo in an effort to raise awareness about endangered red pandas. Two red panda (a.k.a. Firefox) cubs born at the Knoxville Zoo have officially become a part of the Mozilla community. The cubs are named Spark and Ember by online voters and Mozilla broadcast a 24-hour live video stream of the cubs for several months.

See also 

 CZilla, localization and popularization of Mozilla.org products in Czech Republic
 List of Mozilla products

Notes

References

External links 

 About the Mozilla Foundation
 2005 presentation about the Mozilla Foundation
 Press release about the creation of the Mozilla Foundation
 Meeting Minutes from the Weekly Mozilla call
 Mozilla Labs
 Mozilla Research

2003 establishments in the United States
501(c)(3) organizations
Free software project foundations in the United States
Mountain View, California
Mozilla
Non-profit organizations based in the San Francisco Bay Area
Organizations established in 2003
Foundations based in the United States
Internet-related activism